Fudbalski klub Proleter Dvorovi (Serbian Cyrillic: Фудбалски клуб Пpoлeтep Двopoви) is a football club from Dvorovi, Bijeljina, in Republika Srpska, Bosnia and Herzegovina. The club competes in the Second League of the Republika Srpska.

Current squad

External links
 Official website 
 Club at BiHsoccer.

Association football clubs established in 1929
Football clubs in Bosnia and Herzegovina
Football clubs in Republika Srpska
Bijeljina
1929 establishments in Bosnia and Herzegovina